Bulbophyllum calyptratum (hooded bulbophyllum) is a species of orchid.

calyptratum
Taxa named by Friedrich Wilhelm Ludwig Kraenzlin